SM UB-123 was a German Type UB III submarine or U-boat in the German Imperial Navy during World War I. She was commissioned into the German Imperial Navy on 6 April 1918 as SM UB-123.

She torpedoed and sunk  a vessel operated by the City of Dublin Steam Packet Company on 10 October 1918, shortly after the new parliamentary based German Government under Max von Baden had asked U.S. President Woodrow Wilson to negotiate an armistice. 

Leinster went down just outside Dublin Bay. Over 500 people perished in the sinking – the greatest single loss of life in the Irish Sea.

UB-123 struck a mine at the North Sea Mine Barrage on 19 October 1918, all 36 crew members died in the event.

Construction

She was built by AG Weser of Bremen and following just under a year of construction, launched at Bremen on 2 March 1918. UB-123 was commissioned later the same year under the command of Oblt.z.S. Robert Ramm. Like all Type UB III submarines, UB-123 carried 10 torpedoes and was armed with a  deck gun. UB-123 had a displacement of  while surfaced and  when submerged. Her engines enabled her to travel at  when surfaced and  when submerged.

Summary of raiding history

References

Notes

Citations

Bibliography 

 

German Type UB III submarines
World War I submarines of Germany
U-boats commissioned in 1918
1918 ships
Ships built in Bremen (state)
U-boats sunk in 1918
Maritime incidents in 1918
U-boats sunk by mines
World War I shipwrecks in the North Sea
Ships lost with all hands